Vasil Kirov (born 7 December 1975) is a Bulgarian footballer currently playing for Rilski Sportist Samokov as a midfielder.

Kirov previously played for PFC Marek Dupnitsa in the A PFG.

Honours

Club
Litex Lovech
 Bulgarian A Group: 1998–99

References

1975 births
Living people
Bulgarian footballers
F.C. Metalurg Pernik players
PFC Minyor Pernik players
PFC Litex Lovech players
PFC Beroe Stara Zagora players
PFC Slavia Sofia players
PFC Rilski Sportist Samokov players
PFC Lokomotiv Mezdra players
First Professional Football League (Bulgaria) players
Second Professional Football League (Bulgaria) players
Bulgarian expatriate sportspeople in Kazakhstan
Expatriate footballers in Kazakhstan
Association football midfielders
People from Samokov
Sportspeople from Sofia Province